Al-'Ubaydiyya was a Palestinian Arab village in the Tiberias Subdistrict. It was depopulated during the 1947–1948 Civil War in Mandatory Palestine on March 3, 1948. It was located 11 km south of Tiberias, situated close to the Jordan River.

Today the site is a desolate hill named Tel Ubeidiya.

History

Ottoman period
It was mentioned in the Ottoman defter for the year 1555-6, as Mezraa land, (that is, cultivated land), located in the Nahiya of Tabariyya of the Liwa of Safad. The land was designated as Sahi land, that is, land belonging to the Sultan. Pierre Jacotin called the village Abadieh on his map from 1799.

In 1838 Robinson's Biblical Researches in Palestine noted it as a Muslim village, el-'Öbeidiyeh, in the Tiberias District, located south of lake Tiberias.

In 1881, the PEF's Survey of Western Palestine described El Abeidiyeh: "Stone and mud houses, built on a round tell, close to the Jordan river. It contains about 200 Moslems, and the plain is cultivated. There are several mills in the neighbourhood. There are a few small palms, but not many trees round the village." The PEF wrote that the name comes from Arabic word "Abeed", meaning slave. 

A population list from about 1887 showed al Abediyeh to have about 310 inhabitants; all Muslims.

Al-'Ubaydiyya had an elementary school which was founded by the Ottomans.

British Mandate
At the time of the 1922 census of Palestine conducted by the British Mandate authorities, Al-'Ubaydiyya had a population of 336 Muslims, increasing in the 1931 census to 625 Muslims, in 137 houses.

In 1944/1945, the village had a population of 870 Muslims, with a total of 5,173 dunams of land. Of this, Arabs used 3 dunams for citrus and bananas, 1,014 dunams were irrigated or used for orchards,  1,349 were used for cereals, while 24 dunams were classified as built-up (urban) land.

1948, aftermath
The village became depopulated on March 5, 1948.

In 1988, a book about the village was published in Jordan.

In 1992 the village site was described: "The remaining section of the walls of the canal (that provided the mill with water) is the most prominent indication of the former existence of the village. Ruins of houses, piles of stones, the bases of walls, terraces, and date palms can be seen on the site. The lands around the site are cultivated mainly in cotton by the Israelis."

See also
Ubeidiya, prehistoric site near the former village
Al-Ubaid (disambiguation) for Arabic root of the village name

References

Bibliography

 
 
 

Khalifa, Ahmad Mohammad Ali. 1988. Qaryat al-‘Ubaydiyya [The Village of ‘Ubaydiyya]. Jordan: Mataba‘ al-Jazira.

External links
Welcome To al-'Ubaydiyya
al-'Ubaydiyya, Zochrot
Survey of Western Palestine, Map 6: IAA, Wikimedia commons

Arab villages depopulated during the 1948 Arab–Israeli War
District of Tiberias